In nineteenth-century Upper Canada, German-language publications were in high demand, with Germans then the third-largest immigrant group in Canada after the English and French. German migration was concentrated in Waterloo County and its heavily German towns of Berlin (now Kitchener) and Waterloo, with most newspapers established there to service the population. Though Toronto was Canada West's population centre, it was unable to support a large German readership, with its only German-language newspaper moving away after less than a year of publication. German is the only language other than English or French to have had a flourishing newspaper press in Ontario, with approximately thirty German newspapers having been published in the period from 1835 to 1918.

Ontario's first German-language newspaper, Canada Museum und Allgemeine Zeitung, was founded in Berlin in 1835, predating the town's first English-language newspaper by 18 years. In any year between 1859 and 1908, Waterloo County typically had four German newspapers, and always between three and five. In the period from 1835 to 1914, nine German newspapers were founded in Berlin and Waterloo and six in Preston, New Hamburg and Elmira. The publications were not typically read outside of Ontario's German communities, focusing their reporting on local news and interpretations foreign events. Due to their small readership, they exerted little political influence on anything other than a local level. Being largely dependent upon a small population group, most publications folded after only a few years, though the towns Berlin, Waterloo and New Hamburg each supported at least one German newspaper until 1909, by which time all competitors had either folded or amalgamated into Berlin's Berliner Journal.

On 25 September 1918, in the last weeks of the First World War, the Canadian government passed an Order in Council prohibiting "the publication of books, newspapers, magazines or any printed matter in the language of any country or people for the time being at war with Great Britain." The Order had the effect of banning German-language publications, leading to the 1918 closure of the last remaining German newspaper, the Berliner Journal (since renamed the Ontario Journal). Although the government repealed the order in January 1920, it was not until 1967 that another German-language newspaper appeared – the Kitchener Journal, which ceased publication in 1969.

In the wake of the Second World War, a surge in immigration of ethnic Germans from Eastern Europe and Germany led to a small revival of Ontario's German-language newspapers. Toronto's , first published in 2011, is presently Ontario's only German-language newspaper.


Newspapers

See also 
 List of early Canadian newspapers
 List of defunct newspapers of Canada
 History of Canadian newspapers
 German Canadians
 List of German-language newspapers published in the United States

References

Footnotes

Citations

Sources

External links 

General
Canadian Minority Media Database from the University of Alberta's Department of Modern Languages & Cultural Studies
Motz Family Fonds digital exhibit at the University of Waterloo Library. 
Newspapers on Microfilm at the Kitchener Public Library

Digitized newspapers
Berliner Journal 1880–1916 copies (in German) digitized by Simon Fraser University
Der Deutsche Canadier 1856–1864 copies (in German) digitized on Canadian Research Knowledge Network
Der Deutsche in Canada 1872, 1874 copies (in German) digitized on Canadian Research Knowledge Network
Das Echo 1893 copy (in German) digitized on Canadian Research Knowledge Network

History of newspapers
History of mass media in Canada
German-language newspapers published in Ontario